Olakunle Fatukasi (born June 11, 1999) is an American football linebacker for the New England Patriots of the National Football League (NFL). He played college football at Rutgers.

College career
Fatukasi committed to Rutgers as a three star recruit in 2016 as a part of their 2017 class. In His freshman year, he appeared in all twelve of Rutgers’ games. In 2018 he appeared in eleven games compiling twenty tackles between linebacker and special teams. In 2019 he contributed  in all twelve games Rutgers played starting ten of them at weak-side linebacker. In the covid season of 2020 his first under Greg Schiano, Fatukasi was named a team captain. He started all nine games and led the Big Ten in tackles. At one point during the season he was named the Big Ten Co-Defensive player of the week. He was named as a semifinalists for the Butkus Award and earned First-team All-Big Ten from the media and second-team from the coaches. He came back to Rutgers for the 2021 season, due to the NCAA covid exemption. It was announced he would be switching from outside to inside linebacker for the 2021 season. He finished the 2021 season named third-team all Big Ten even though he missed multiple games due to injury.

Professional career

Tampa Bay Buccaneers
Fatukasi signed with the Tampa Bay Buccaneers as an undrafted free agent on May 13, 2022. He made the Buccaneers' initial 53-man roster out of training camp. He played in 13 games before being waived on December 13, 2022.

Denver Broncos
On December 16, 2022, Fatukasi was signed to the Denver Broncos practice squad.

New England Patriots
On January 18, 2023, Fatukasi signed a reserve/future contract with the New England Patriots.

Personal life
Fatukasi is of Nigerian descent. He has two brothers, his younger brother Tunde, previously played at Rutgers and now plays at Bowling Green. His older brother, Folorunso played football at UConn and currently plays for the Jacksonville Jaguars. He has his own t-shirt company called O3.

References

External links
 Tampa Bay Buccaneers bio
 Rutgers Scarlet Knights bio

Living people
1999 births
21st-century African-American sportspeople
African-American players of American football
American sportspeople of Nigerian descent
People from Far Rockaway, Queens
Sportspeople from Queens, New York
Players of American football from New York City
American football linebackers
Rutgers Scarlet Knights football players
Tampa Bay Buccaneers players
New England Patriots players